David William Ernest Webster (20 October 1923 – 7 January 1969) was a British Conservative Party politician.

Born in Arbroath, Scotland, Webster was educated at Fettes College, Edinburgh and Downing College, Cambridge (MA History), and was a stockbroker before entering Parliament. He contested Bristol North East in 1955. He was elected as Member of Parliament (MP) for Weston-super-Mare in the 1958 by-election after the death of Sir Ian Leslie Orr-Ewing. He was returned at the three subsequent general elections.

Webster died suddenly at Westminster Hospital on 7th January 1969, after being taken ill following an Austrian ski holiday with his family. He had a fall while skiing but it was not clear if this was a contributory factor in his death. He was 45 years old. The consequent by-election for his seat was won by the Conservative candidate, Jerry Wiggin.

References

Times Guide to the House of Commons, Times Newspapers Limited, 1997

Webster, David William Ernest
People from Arbroath
Webster, David William Ernest
Webster, David William Ernest
Alumni of Downing College, Cambridge
UK MPs 1955–1959
UK MPs 1959–1964
UK MPs 1964–1966
UK MPs 1966–1970